Baeckea kandos is a species of flowering plant in the family Myrtaceae and is endemic to a restricted area of New South Wales. It is a spreading shrub with narrow egg-shaped to linear leaves and small white flowers with ten to twelve stamens.

Description 
There are ten to twelve stamens in groups of up to three.

Taxonomy
Baeckea kandos was first formally described in 1977 by Anthony Bean in the journal Telopea from specimens collected near Dunns Swamp in Wollemi National Park. The specific epithet (kandos) refers to the town of Kandos, near where the type specimens were collected.

Distribution and habitat
Baeckea kandos grows in heathland or shrubland but is only known from two populations in Wollemi National Park, numbering about 100 plants.

Conservation status
This baeckea is listed as "endangered" under the Australian Government Environment Protection and Biodiversity Conservation Act 1999 and the New South Wales Government Biodiversity Conservation Act 2016. The main threats to the species are activities associated with track maintenance, inappropriate fire regimes and its small population size.

References

kandos
Flora of New South Wales
Plants described in 1977
Taxa named by Anthony Bean